Sinaboi is a fishing village and district (kecamatan) in Rokan Hilir Regency, Riau, Indonesia. It is about 30 km east of Bagansiapiapi and about 30 km from Dumai.

The majority of Sinaboi villagers are ethnic Chinese. In Hokkian language, it is called Cia Cui Kang.

The village had a population of 2,351 at the 2010 Census, while the district had 11,081 inhabitants at the same Census.

References
 Community website
 Official Regency Website

Populated places in Riau
Regencies of Riau